Edwin Lee Norris (August 15, 1865 – April 25, 1924) was a Democratic politician from Montana. He served as the fifth Governor of Montana.

Biography
Norris was born in Cumberland County, Kentucky in 1865, and graduated from the Southern Normal School, now Western Kentucky University in Bowling Green, Kentucky. He moved from Kentucky to Montana in 1888, studied law and was admitted to the Montana bar on October 8, 1889. He married Elizabeth June Wilkins. He practiced law in Dillon, Montana and was city attorney there for five years.

Career
Norris was elected to the Montana State Senate in 1896 and served until 1900, serving as the Senate President in 1899. He served as the state's fifth Lieutenant Governor from 1905 to 1908.

He became Governor on April 1, 1908 upon the resignation of Joseph K. Toole, and was elected in his own right in the November 1908 election, serving until 1913. Norris is credited with signing state laws prohibiting discrimination by life insurance companies and making mine operators liable when employees became disabled.

Death
Norris died in Great Falls, Montana in 1924, where he had lived since leaving the Governor's office. He was first buried in Fairview Cemetery and later moved to New Highland Cemetery where he is still interred.

References

External links
 State of Montana profile
National Governors Association biography

1865 births
1924 deaths
People from Cumberland County, Kentucky
Western Kentucky University alumni
Montana lawyers
Democratic Party Montana state senators
Lieutenant Governors of Montana
Democratic Party governors of Montana
American Presbyterians
People from Dillon, Montana
19th-century American lawyers